Francis Dods (23 February 1879 – 29 June 1910) was a Scottish rugby union player.

He also played for Edinburgh Academicals.

He was the brother of John Dods who was also capped for Scotland.

References
 Bath, Richard (ed.) The Scotland Rugby Miscellany (Vision Sports Publishing Ltd, 2007 )

1879 births
1910 deaths
Edinburgh Academicals rugby union players
Scotland international rugby union players
Scottish rugby union players